The Blanks House, located at 201 Wall Street in Columbia, Louisiana, was built in about 1900.  It has also been known as Adams House.  It was listed on the National Register of Historic Places in 1995.

The house has elements of Colonial Revival, Queen Anne, and other styles.

It was deemed notable as "It is one of the largest historic structures, and is the largest residence, in Columbia, and "In contrast to the conventional historic building stock described above, the house features an exotic blend of Gothic, Colonial Revival, Queen Anne, and Eastlake features. Thus, it is the most highly styled residence in the town."

See also 
National Register of Historic Places listings in Caldwell Parish, Louisiana

References

Houses on the National Register of Historic Places in Louisiana
Houses completed in 1900
Caldwell Parish, Louisiana